Paweł Holc (born June 21, 1971 in Lublin) is a Polish footballer. Holc's career started while he was still a youngster in 1989 for Górnik Łęczna before he moved to Lublinianka Lublin in 1990/91. Still having not made his league debut by the beginning of the 1994/95 season, he moved to Stal Stalowa Wola.

Holc made his league debut on March 4, 1995 and has slowly made his way up to become one of the most respected players in the Polish league, bolstered by a move to top-tier team Stomil Olsztyn. Holc is one of the more-respected players in the Polish league, having played professional football for sixteen years, but also having overcome great personal tragedy, including the death of his wife.

Holc went to Wisła Płock in the 2002/03 before beginning to train players in the 2003/04 season. Currently Holc is playing in Norway.

See also
Football in Poland
List of football clubs in Poland

References

Polish footballers
Górnik Łęczna players
Wisła Płock players
OKS Stomil Olsztyn players
1971 births
Living people
Sportspeople from Lublin
Association footballers not categorized by position